Épinal prints were prints on popular subjects rendered in bright sharp colours, sold in France in the 19th century.  They owe their name to the fact that the first publisher of such images —  — having been born in Épinal, named the printing house he founded in 1796, .

The expression image d'Épinal has become proverbial in French and refers to an emphatically traditionalist and naïve depiction of something, showing only its good aspects.

The prints were also a regular point of comparison for criticizing paintings by Courbet - notably his Burial at Ornans and  - and Manet.  Acknowledging the proximity of some of Manet's works, like his Fifer, Zola turned the comparison into praise.

Image Gallery

External link

Printmaking
Épinal